Kozhikode or Calicut is a city in Kerala, India. It may also refer to:
 Kozhikode district, a district in Kerala
 Kozhikode (Lok Sabha constituency), a constituency in Kerala
 Kingdom of Kozhikode, a medieval polity ruled by the Zamorins of Calicut